Interiors and still lifes by Frank Weston Benson includes oil and water color paintings and a couple of etchings made by Frank Weston Benson. He also made portraits, waterscapes, wildlife, landscapes and other works of art.

While Benson's works of interior settings and still lifes was limited in comparison to other compositions or settings, he exhibited expertise at capturing light and shadow of interior spaces.

Benson painting a series of true still lifes about 1919. In the arrangements, he gathered objects from his seafaring ancestors on their trips to the Orient: porcelains, candlesticks, oriental screens, and embroidered silk tablecloths. He arranged and rearranged them to create interesting compositions. Whatever the subject matter, Benson always sought a "harmonious arrangement." He said to his daughter Eleanor, "A picture is merely an experiment in design. If the design is pleasing, the picture is good, no matter whether composed of objects, still life, figures or birds. Few appreciate that what makes them admire a picture is the design made by the painter."

After a day of hunting, Benson brought home a rail and snipe and hammered them to the barn door. He found that he was interested in capturing the two birds and made oil paintings of each. Although he was a teenager, he had an exceptional grasp of light and its effects. Rail, one of Benson's earliest paintings, was made when he was 16 and his goal was to become an ornithological illustrator.

In Firelight, Benson depicts a woman wearing a white dress in an interior setting. Her left arm is outstretched, to the right in a large vase. It won an award with a cash prize that allowed Benson to realize a lifelong dream, a hunting cabin, which he purchased with two of his brothers-in-law.

Works

Notes

References

Bibliography

External links

Frank Weston Benson